Molo is a district of Iloilo City in Iloilo Province, on Panay Island in the Western Visayas region of the Philippines. It is the most densely populated district of all the seven districts of Iloilo City. Molo was a separate municipality before it was incorporated into the then-municipality of Iloilo by virtue of Act No. 719 of 1903. Molo was originally the Parián (Chinese district or Chinatown) of Iloilo, which is the area that the Chinese residents of Iloilo lived in. It is also known as the "Athens of the Philippines," being the birthplace of famous Philippine Ilustrados and numerous of the country's greatest philosophers and political leaders, including numerous chief justices, senators, governors, generals, congressmen, and cabinet officials. Molo is popular for its Molo Church, a centuries-old church which lies in front of the Molo Plaza. The district is also known for its Pancit Molo, another popular Ilonggo dish, named after a district of Iloilo City where it originated.

According to the 2020 census, Molo has a population of 76,393 people, making it the second-most populous district of Iloilo City, after Jaro.

Etymology 
The name "Molo" came from the word "moro", the name of the Islamic group called Moro that frequently raided the town. The town's population had a predominance of Chinese, who had difficulty pronouncing the "r" and kept pronouncing molo instead of moro.

History 
Molo was founded after the Chinese traders supplying the colonists then established themselves in the area. It was formally established by the Spaniards as Parián (Chinese district or Chinatown) in 1637. During the 1800s, Molo became the center of learning in the Visayas and earned the sobriquet "Athens of the Philippines".

On August 4, 1896, the Philippines' national hero, José Rizal, visited Molo on his way to Manila from exile in Dapitan in Zamboanga del Norte. He exclaimed, "La iglesia bonita!" as he saw the Molo Church, acknowledging its beauty.

Molo was incorporated into Iloilo City as a district on July 16, 1937, along with the towns of Arevalo, La Paz, and Mandurriao, by virtue of Act No. 719 of 1903.

Economy
The district of Molo is one of the major commercial areas in Iloilo City. The Department of Social Welfare and Development (DSWD) and Bureau of Internal Revenue (BIR) are among the government agencies with regional offices in Molo.

Culture and landmarks

Molo Church 
The notable Spanish-colonial church and heritage site in the district. It stands in front of Molo Plaza, with prominent red spires that crown its tall bell towers. Molo Church is also known as "the feminist church" because of the all-women's ensemble of saints represented in 16 statues perched on the aisle pillars. The church was declared a national landmark by the National Historical Institute in 1992 through the representation of Sir Knight Rex S. Salvilla. It is the only Gothic church in the country outside of Manila.

Molo Mansion 
The Yusay-Consing Mansion, more popularly known as Molo Mansion, stands across the Molo Plaza and Molo Church. Its features are its high ceilings, Neoclassical balustrades, and decorative carvings.

Molo Plaza 
One of the seven district plazas in Iloilo City. Molo Plaza is considered the most beautiful public plaza in the city. The plaza features statues of Greek goddesses and the monument of Maria Clara. A fountain was also installed to break the monotony of the artworks during the rehabilitation in August 2022.

Molo Fiesta 
The annual celebration of the feast of Saint Anne, the patron saint of the district, is celebrated every July 26.

Pancit Molo 
Pancit Molo is a pork dumpling soup. It is a type of soup made with wonton wrappers. It consists of a mixture of ground pork wrapped in molo or wonton wrapper, shredded chicken meat, and also shrimp. Pancit Molo originated in Molo, hence the name.

Education 
Molo was an educational center during the Spanish occupation in the Philippines, being the only pueblo (town) in the country which has four colleges—Collegio de Santa Ana of the Avanceña sisters; Centro Escolar de Molo of the Salas brothers; Instituto Ensenanza Libre de Molo of Manuel Locsin; and Escuela Publica. In 1903, the labor leader and writer Rosendo Mejica founded the Baluarte Elementary School, the first public elementary school outside of Manila; his house, fronting the school, is a museum.

Currently, Molo has one university, John B. Lacson Foundation Maritime University, and four colleges—Iloilo City Community College; Iloilo Doctors' College; Iloilo Doctors' College of Medicine; and St. Therese – MTC colleges.

The national high school of the city, Iloilo City National High School, is also located in Molo.

Barangays 
Molo District is composed of 25 barangays. The barangay of Calumpang in Molo is Iloilo City's most populous barangay, with a population of 15,994 people (2020 census). Molo is also the most densely populated district in Iloilo City, with a population density of 13,797 people per square kilometer.

Notable people

Several known families that came from Molo include - the Locsin, Lacson, Sayson, Pison, Layson, Yusay, among others, who are descended from Chinese immigrants who hispanized, adopted Roman Catholicism and settled in Molo.

Being an educational center during the Spanish occupation in the Philippines and being known as the "Athens of the Philippines", Molo produced many learned men and political leaders, including many chief justices, justices of the Supreme Court, senators, governors, mayors, several generals of the Philippine revolution, and other notable figures. A few of the notable Moleños include:
Jhett Tolentino, award-winning Broadway producer.
Rodolfo T. Ganzon, Filipino politician and a former Senator of the Republic of the Philippines, Congressman of the Second District of Iloilo, Mayor of Iloilo City.
Jed Patrick Mabilog, former Mayor of Iloilo City.
Franklin Drilon, Senate Minority Leader and former President of the Senate of the Philippines.

 Ramon Avanceña, former Chief Justice of the Supreme Court of the Philippines and served as a legal adviser to the Federal State of the Visayas, the revolutionary government of provinces of Iloilo, Capiz and Antique.
 Gregorio Araneta, former Chief Justice and Secretary of the Malolos Congress and First Secretary of Justice.
 Raymundo Melliza, former Chief Justice, General of the Philippine Revolution, and Governor of Iloilo.
 Felicisimo Feria, former Chief Justice.
 Francisco Villanueva, former Senator and Representative of the First District of Iloilo, and as the first Senator of the Seventh Senatorial District comprising Iloilo, Capiz and Romblon. He also served as Senate Majority Floor Leader during the Fourth Legislature in 1916-1919.
 Esteban de la Rama, former Senator.
 Esperidion Guanco, former Senator.
 Jose Ma. Arroyo, former Senator and Representative of the First District of Iloilo from 1916 to 1919. He is the grandfather of former First Gentleman, Jose Miguel Arroyo who is the husband of former President Gloria Macapagal Arroyo.
 Francisco Zulueta, former Senator.
 Jose C. Zulueta, former Provincial Governor of Iloilo and Senator.
 Potenciano Treñas, former Senator.
 Amado Avanceña, former Governor of Iloilo.
 Gregorio Yulo, former Governor of Iloilo.
 Mariano Yulo, former Governor of Negros Occidental.
 Jose Yulo-Regalado, former Governor of Iloilo.
 Timoteo Consing Sr., former Governor of Iloilo.
 Esteban de la Rama, former General of the Philippine Revolution and First Commandant of the Philippine Marines.
 Pablo Araneta, former General of the Philippine Revolution.
 Angel Corteza, former General of the Philippine Revolution.
 Aniceto Lacson, former General of the Philippine Revolution and leader of the Negros Revolution.
 Juan Araneta, former General of the Philippine Revolution and leader of the Negros Revolution.

See also 

 Molo Church
 Molo Mansion
 Pancit Molo

References

External links

 Iloilo City Government Official Website

Districts of Iloilo City
Former municipalities of the Philippines